WSCN (100.5 FM) is a radio station licensed to Cloquet, Minnesota, serving the Duluth-Superior area. The station is owned by Minnesota Public Radio (MPR), and airs MPR's "News and Information" network, originating from the Twin Cities. The station has inserts at least once an hour for local underwriting and weather. MPR also maintains an office and studio in downtown Duluth.

WSCN broadcasts in HD.

History
WSCN signed on as WKLK-FM at 100.9 MHz on November 17, 1975. It was owned with WKLK (1230 AM) and almost entirely simulcast it. The station was sold to Minnesota Public Radio in 1988 for $200,000 and upgraded its signal from 3,000 watts to 100,000 watts, and relocating to 100.5.

On January 20, 2016, MPR announced that WSCD-FM translator 90.9 W215CG and WSCN-HD2 would air its adult album alternative network The Current beginning February 1, 2016. Programming originates from MPR's studios in St. Paul, but a local program featuring Duluth music is produced for the network.

External links
WSCN page at Minnesota Public Radio

References

Radio stations in Minnesota
Minnesota Public Radio
NPR member stations
Cloquet, Minnesota